"Cochranella" ramirezi is a species of frog in the family Centrolenidae. It is endemic to Colombia. Its natural habitats are subtropical or tropical moist lowland forests and rivers.

References

Cochranella
Amphibians of Colombia
Taxonomy articles created by Polbot